Minisink Hills is an unincorporated community located in Smithfield Township in Monroe County, Pennsylvania. Minisink Hills is located at the intersection of Gap View Drive and Hillside Drive, along the west bank of Marshalls Creek, east of East Stroudsburg.

References

Unincorporated communities in Monroe County, Pennsylvania
Unincorporated communities in Pennsylvania